Metroid Prime 4 is an upcoming video game developed by Retro Studios and published by Nintendo for the Nintendo Switch. It was announced at E3 2017, and was reportedly initially developed by Bandai Namco Studios. In January 2019, Nintendo announced that development had restarted under Retro Studios, developer of the previous Metroid Prime games. Kensuke Tanabe, who worked on the first Prime games, returned as a producer.

Development
Nintendo announced Metroid Prime 4 during the Nintendo Direct presentation at E3 2017. Bill Trinen, director of product marketing at Nintendo of America, confirmed that Metroid Prime 4 would involve Metroid producer Kensuke Tanabe but not Retro Studios, which had developed the previous Metroid Prime games. While not confirmed by Nintendo, Eurogamer reported that Prime 4 was being developed by Bandai Namco Studios of Japan and Singapore; the Bandai Singapore staff included former LucasArts staff who had worked on the cancelled Star Wars 1313.

In 2018, then-Nintendo of America president Reggie Fils-Aimé stated that Metroid Prime 4 was "well into development" and "proceeding well". However, Nintendo did not show it during their E3 2018 Nintendo Direct, and said they would only share more information once they believed they "had something that would wow people".

In a video released online in January 2019, Nintendo EPD general manager Shinya Takahashi announced that development on Metroid Prime 4 had restarted under Retro Studios with Tanabe. Takahashi said that development under the previous studio had not met Nintendo's standards and that the decision to restart the project was not taken lightly.

In October 2020, Retro posted a job advertisement seeking storyboard artists to work on "emotional" and "interesting and innovative scenes that elevate the narrative". Video Games Chronicle took this as an indication of a more cinematic focus than previous Metroid Prime games.

References

External links
 Official Metroid series website
 Official Retro Studios website

Upcoming video games
Metroid games
Metroid Prime
Nintendo Switch games
Nintendo Switch-only games
Retro Studios games
Video game sequels
Video games developed in the United States
Video games produced by Kensuke Tanabe